Niccolò Orsini is the name of:
 Nicholas Orsini (d. 1323), ruler of Cephalonia and Epirus
Niccolò Orsini (bishop) (died 1653), Roman Catholic bishop 
Niccolò di Pitigliano (1442–1510), Italian condottiero and Captain-General of the Venetians